Strip Tease is the third studio album by a Polish thrash metal band Acid Drinkers. It was recorded in Izabelin Studio near Warsaw.
The album features fifteen tracks sung not only by Titus and Litza, but also Popcorn.
It includes also two cover songs: the first one is an acoustic version of Metallica's classic, "Seek & Destroy". It is sung by a Polish artist, Edyta Bartosiewicz. The second one is "Menel Song/Always Look on the Bright Side of Life", a remake of a song by Monty Python. This song was a result of bands watching of Life of Brian and at first was not planned to be recorded. It is said that one more cover song was intended: a reggae version of Slayer's "Black Magic".

Track listing 
 "Strip Tease" – 3:05
 "King Kong Bless You" – 2:15
 "Seek & Destroy" (Metallica cover) – 3:17
 "Rock'N'Roll Beast" – 4:13
 "Rats / Feeling Nasty" – 3:52
 "Poplin' Twist" – 4:02
 "Masterhood of Hearts Devouring" – 3:59
 "You Are Lost My Dear" – 3:37
 "Menel Song / Always Look on the Bright Side of Life" (Monty Python) – 2:26
 "Blood Is Boiling" – 4:24
 "My Caddish Promise" – 3:53
 "Mentally Deficient" – 3:39
 "Hell It Is a Place on Earth" – 4:08
 "Ronnie and the Brother Spider" – 2:47
 "I'm a Rocker" – 4:33

Personnel 
 Tomasz "Titus" Pukacki – vocals, bass
 Robert "Litza" Friedrich – guitar, vocals (on tracks 5, 6)
 Darek "Popcorn" Popowicz – guitar, vocals (2, 11)
 Maciej "Ślimak" Starosta – drums

Acid Drinkers albums
1992 albums